Anapliomera is a genus of trilobites in the order Phacopida, fossils of which are found in Illinois, U.S.A. It was described by Demott in 1987, and the type species is Anapliomera shirlandensis.

References

External links
 Anapliomera at the Paleobiology Database

Fossils of the United States
Pliomeridae
Phacopida genera